The Prime Yalta Rally 2011, was the 4th round of the 2011 Intercontinental Rally Challenge (IRC) season. The fourteen stage asphalt rally took place over 2–4 June 2011.

Introduction
Yalta was the base for the first ever visit of the IRC to Ukraine. The rally started with two short stages on the afternoon of Thursday 2 June prior to the ceremonial start on the Yalta waterfront. Fifteen of the top IRC competitors contested the rally, including Bryan Bouffier, Juho Hänninen, and Tour de Corse winner Thierry Neuville.

Results
Juho Hänninen won his second IRC rally of the season, having taken the lead towards the end of the second day of the rally, and held an advantage all the way to the end. His victory gave him the championship lead by three points ahead of Jan Kopecký. Kopecký finished the rally in third position, behind Bryan Bouffier.

Overall

Special stages

References

External links 
 The official website for the rally
 The official website of the Intercontinental Rally Challenge

Yalta
Yalta
Prime Yalta Rally
International sports competitions hosted by Ukraine